European route E 805 is a European B class road in Portugal, connecting the cities of Vila Nova de Famalicão – Chaves.

Route 
 
 Vila Nova de Famalicão
 E801 Chaves

External links 
 UN Economic Commission for Europe: Overall Map of E-road Network (2007)
 International E-road network

International E-road network
Roads in Portugal